Athang (formerly Alla) is a village in central-southern Bhutan. It is located in Wangdue Phodrang District.

Gallery

See also
List of cities, towns and villages in Bhutan

References

Populated places in Bhutan